Hanaoui is a surname. Notable people with the surname include:

Melinda Hanaoui (born 1990), Algerian volleyball player
Sehryne Hanaoui (born 1988), Algerian volleyball player